Jerusalem is the 10th studio album by American singer-songwriter Steve Earle, released in 2002.  A concept album, it has a political theme, and contains songs about a post–September 11, 2001 world.

Track listing
All tracks composed by Steve Earle; except where indicated

 "Ashes to Ashes" – 4:02
 "Amerika V. 6.0 (The Best We Can Do)"  – 4:19
 "Conspiracy Theory"  – 4:14 (Duet with Siobhan Kennedy)
 "John Walker's Blues" – 3:41
 "The Kind"  – 2:04
 "What's A Simple Man To Do?"  – 2:29
 "The Truth" – 2:21
 "Go Amanda" – 3:34 (Earle, Sheryl Crow)
 "I Remember You" – 2:53 (Duet with Emmylou Harris)
 "Shadowland" – 2:52
 "Jerusalem'" – 3:56

Personnel
Steve Earle - vocals, guitar, bass, organ, banjo, mandolin, harmonium, harmonica
Emmylou Harris - vocals
Siobhan Kennedy - vocals
Eric Ambel - guitar, vocals
Dane Clark - drum loop
Ken Coomer - drums
John Barlow Jarvis - electric piano
Kelly Looney - bass
Kenny Malone - drums, percussion
Will Rigby - drums, percussion
Patrick Earle - percussion
Tony Fitzpatrick - album Artwork

Chart performance

Year-end charts

References

2002 albums
Steve Earle albums
Artemis Records albums